The Cape Tryon Light is a lighthouse on the western north coast of Prince Edward Island, Canada, located on Cousins Shore about 4 km (2.5 mi) west of the cape. The station was built in 1905 and it characterised as a white building with red trim; with the lantern painted red.
 
The original Cape Tryon lighthouse was deactivated in 1969. A second lighthouse was built on Cape Tryon itself, opened in 1969, and is still active. It is located a few kilometres north of the village of French River.

See also
 List of lighthouses in Prince Edward Island
 List of lighthouses in Canada

References

External links
 Aids to Navigation Canadian Coast Guard

Lighthouses completed in 1905
Lighthouses in Prince Edward Island
1905 establishments in Canada